Svenska Supercupen 2013, Swedish Super Cup 2013, was the 7th Svenska Supercupen, an annual football match held by the winners of the previous season's Allsvenskan and Svenska Cupen competitions. This marked the first time that the cup was held after the end of the standard league season. The match was played at Swedbank Stadion, Malmö, on 10 November 2013, and was played by the 2013 Allsvenskan champions Malmö FF and the 2012–13 Svenska Cupen champions IFK Göteborg. The match was IFK Göteborg's fourth and Malmö FF's second appearance in the competition. The two clubs played against each other for the first time in the cup's history and it was the second time that the competition was hosted at Swedbank Stadion.

In Sweden the match was broadcast live on TV4 Sport. Andreas Ekberg from Lund was the referee for match, his first time officiating the competition. Malmö FF won the match after two goals from Emil Forsberg and a late winner by Guillermo Molins. Malmö FF took the lead twice during the course of the game before scoring the winning goal in injury time in the second half. This marked the first time that Malmö FF won Svenska Supercupen.

Background
In 2012 Svenska Cupen changed to a fall-spring season format and therefore no team had won a cup title since Helsingborgs IF in the 2011 edition. Had the cup format not changed, 2012 Allsvenskan champions IF Elfsborg would have met the 2012 cup champions in the 2013 edition of Svenska Supercupen, normally held in March before the start of Allsvenskan. Instead the Swedish Football Association announced that the 2013 Svenska Supercupen would be contested by the winners of 2013 Allsvenskan and the winners of 2012–13 Svenska Cupen in November 2013 after the conclusion of the league season. IFK Göteborg won the 2012–13 Svenska Cupen on 26 May 2013 and thus qualified for the 2013 Supercupen.

Since IFK Göteborg were in the running for the 2013 Allsvenskan title with three other teams, there was a possibility that their opponent in this match would be the runners-up of Allsvenskan if IFK Göteborg had won the league title. IFK Göteborg's title contenders were Malmö FF, Helsingborgs IF and AIK, all of which had competed in Supercupen previously. The league ended on 3 November 2013 although IFK Göteborg's opponent was confirmed on 28 October 2013 when Malmö FF secured the league title. As league winners, Malmö FF had  home ground advantage in Supercupen. The two Allsvenskan matches in 2013 between Malmö FF and IFK Göteborg had ended in a 1–1 tie in Gothenburg in April and a 3–1 for Malmö FF in Malmö in August. This was the first time since 2001 that the two clubs met in a domestic cup match and the first time since 1986 that they met in a cup final.

Match facts

See also
2013 Allsvenskan
2012–13 Svenska Cupen

References

External links
 

Super
2013 Svenska Supercupen
Sports competitions in Malmö
2010s in Malmö
Malmö FF matches
IFK Göteborg matches